Low Saxon, also known as West Low German are a group of Low German dialects spoken in parts of the Netherlands, northwestern Germany and southern Denmark (in North Schleswig by parts of the German-speaking minority). It is one of two groups of mutually intelligible dialects, the other being East Low German dialects. A 2005 study found that there were approximately 1.8 million "daily speakers" of Low Saxon in the Netherlands. 53% spoke Low Saxon or Low Saxon and Dutch at home and 71% could speak it. According to another study the percentage of speakers among parents dropped from 34% in 1995 to 15% in 2011. The percentage of speakers among their children dropped from 8% to 2% in the same period.

Extent
The language area comprises the North German states of Lower Saxony, North Rhine-Westphalia (the Westphalian part), Bremen, Hamburg, Schleswig-Holstein and Saxony-Anhalt (the northwestern areas around Magdeburg) as well as the northeast of the Netherlands (i.e. Dutch Low Saxon, spoken in Groningen, Drenthe, Overijssel and northern Gelderland) and the Schleswigsch dialect spoken by the North Schleswig Germans in the southernmost part of Denmark.

In the south the Benrath line and Uerdingen line isoglosses form the border with the area, where West Central German variants of High German are spoken.

List of dialects

Germany
West Low German
Westphalian, including the region around Münster and the Osnabrück region of Lower Saxony
Eastphalian, spoken in southeastern Lower Saxony (Hanover, Braunschweig, Göttingen) and in the Magdeburg Börde region
Northern Low Saxon
East Frisian Low Saxon in East Frisia
Dithmarsisch
Schleswig[i]sch
Holsteinisch
Hamburgisch
Nordhannoversch
Emsländisch
Oldenburgisch in the Oldenburg region

Netherlands

While Dutch is a Low Franconian language, the Dutch Low Saxon varieties, which the Dutch government considers to be Dutch dialects, form a dialect continuum with the Westphalian language. They consist of:
West Low German
Westphalian
 Stellingwarfs in southeastern Friesland
 Midden-Drents
 Zuud-Drèents
 Tweants and Tweants-Groafschops in the Twente region of Overijssel and the adjacent Achterhoek region of Gelderland
 Veluws in the Veluwe region of Gelderland
 Gelders-Overijssels
 Achterhooks
 Sallaans in the Salland region of western Overijssel
 Urkers on the former island of Urk in Flevoland
Northern Low Saxon
 Westerkwartiers, in western Groningen
 Gronings, in Groningen and northern Drenthe, by its Frisian substratum related to Friso-Saxon dialects

Denmark
West Low German
Northern Low Saxon
 Schleswigsch dialect spoken in former South Jutland County (the northern part of the former Duchy of Schleswig) around Aabenraa (Apenrade)

References 

Culture of Lower Saxony
Dutch dialects
German dialects
Low German